A House is Built (1929) is the first novel of M. Barnard Eldershaw, the joint pseudonym of Marjorie Barnard and Flora Eldershaw. It was written as a result of their seeing an advertisement for The Bulletin prize. The novel won this prize in 1928, shared with Katharine Susannah Prichard's Coonardoo. It was originally serialised in The Bulletin under the title, The Quartermaster.

Plot introduction
The novel centres on James Hyde and his family.  A former Royal Navy quartermaster, in 1837 Hyde sets up a business in early Sydney.  He brings his family to Australia and would have his sons and grandsons continue his business.  They are either disinclined to take up the business or more interested in the Australian gold-fields. His daughter Fanny has all the qualities needed to continue the family business. Constricted by gender stereotypes, Hyde, his business, and his family fall into tragedy.

References

External links
 A House is Built from The Cambridge Companion to Australian Literature at Google Books
 A House is Built at the National Library of Australia

1929 Australian novels
Collaborative novels
Novels first published in serial form
Works originally published in The Bulletin (Australian periodical)
Works published under a pseudonym
Novels set in Sydney
Australian historical novels
George G. Harrap and Co. books